Longva is a village in Ålesund Municipality in Møre og Romsdal county, Norway. The village is located on the southwest side of the island of Skuløya, along the Longvafjorden. The population (2003) was 637, but since 2004, Longva has not been considered an urban settlement by Statistics Norway, and its data is therefore not registered.

References

Villages in Møre og Romsdal
Ålesund

no:Skuløya